This article describes two- and three-letter combinations (so-called digraphs and trigraphs) used for the Mongolian language when written in the Mongolian script.

Vowel and consonant combinations 
 Long  with: .
 Long  with: , .

 Vowel combinations 

 Most of the 's of these diphthongs derive from an earlier , but is no longer recognized as such. The  origin can for instance be seen in the two long teeth of   'good'. These former of these strokes has become shortened in recent manuscripts: .

Notes

References 

Articles containing Mongolian script text
Mongolic letters
Mongolian language